Edward Bell (born 23 December 1883) was an English professional footballer who played as a full-back for Sunderland.

References

1883 births
People from Burnopfield
Footballers from County Durham
English footballers
Association football fullbacks
West Stanley F.C. players
Bishop Auckland F.C. players
Seaham White Star F.C. players
Sunderland A.F.C. players
Spennymoor United F.C. players
English Football League players
Year of death missing